A field-sequential color system (FSC) is a color television system in which the primary color information is transmitted in successive images and which relies on the human vision system to fuse the successive images into a color picture. One field-sequential system was developed by Dr. Peter Goldmark for CBS, which was its sole user in commercial broadcasting. It was first demonstrated to the press on September 4, 1940, and first shown to the general public on January 12, 1950. The Federal Communications Commission adopted it on October 11, 1950, as the standard for color television in the United States, but it was later withdrawn.

History

The use of sequential color systems for moving images predates the invention of fully electronic television. Described at the time as "additive" rather than sequential color systems, two-color Kinemacolor, in commercial use since 1906, and its predecessor three-color format, invented by Edward Raymond Turner and patented in 1899, were both sequential natural color  systems for use with motion picture film. They utilized black-and-white film and rotating color filter wheels to record the amount of each color in the scene on alternating frames of the film, so that when the frames were projected by light of similar colors at a sufficiently rapid rate, those colors blended together in the color center of the viewer's occipital lobe, producing a wider range of hues. 

Due to litigation by William Friese-Greene, Kinemacolor ended up in the public domain in 1915, after which several derivative sequential color processes (such as Friese-Greene's Biocolour and the original Prisma Color) were developed. Some were brought to the point of being publicly shown, but during the 1920s they could not compete with rival bipack and other subtractive color processes, which were free of color flicker and did not require special projection equipment—the final multicolored images were right there on the film as transparent coloring matter.

Operation

The CBS field-sequential system was an example of a mechanical television system because it relied in part on a disc of color filters rotating at 1440 rpm inside the camera and the receiver, capturing and displaying red, green, and blue television images in sequence. The field rate was increased from 60 to 144 fields per second to overcome the flicker from the separate color images, resulting in 24 complete color frames per second (each of the three colors was scanned twice, double interlacing being standard for all electronic television: 2 scans × 3 colors × 24 frames per second = 144 fields per second), instead of the standard 30 frames/60 fields per second of monochrome. If the 144-field color signal were transmitted with the same detail as a 60-field monochrome signal, 2.4 times the bandwidth would be required. Therefore, to keep the signal within the standard 6-MHz bandwidth of a channel, the image's vertical resolution was reduced from 525 lines to 405. The vertical resolution was 77% of monochrome, and the horizontal resolution was 54% of monochrome.

Because of these variances in resolution and frame rate from the NTSC standards for television broadcasting, field-sequential color broadcasts could not be seen on existing black and white receivers without an adapter (to see them in monochrome), or adapter-converter (to see them in color).

Commercial failure
CBS purchased its own television manufacturer in April 1951 when no other company would produce color sets using the system. Production of CBS-Columbia color receivers began in September; they were first offered for retail sale in October.

Field-sequential color broadcasts were suspended by CBS on October 21, 1951, ostensibly by request of the National Production Authority, which in November 1951 prohibited the manufacture of color sets for the general public during the Korean War. Only 200 color sets had been manufactured for commercial sale, and only 100 of those had shipped, when CBS suspended its color broadcasts. CBS announced in March 1953 that it had abandoned any further plans for its color system. RCA was the leading company in the television field, with a larger technical staff, more development funds, and more political success in getting the NTSC compatible color television system. RCA developed the hardware for NTSC  which superseded the field-sequential system as the U.S. standard in December 1953.

Predecessor inventions
According to television historian Albert Abramson, A. A. Polumordvinov invented the first field-sequential color system. Polumordvinov applied for his Russian patent 10738 in 1899. This system scanned images with two rotating cylinders. A later German patent by A. Frankenstein and Werner von Jaworski described another field-sequential system. Like the CBS System, this patent included a color wheel. Frankenstein and Jaworski applied for their patent 172376 in 1904. 

John Logie Baird demonstrated a version of field-sequential color television on July 3, 1928, using a mechanical television system before his use of cathode ray tubes, and producing a vertical color image about 4 inches (10 cm) high. It was described in the journal Nature:
The process consisted of first exploring the object, the image of which is to be transmitted, with a spot of red light, next with a spot of green light, and finally with a spot of blue light. At the receiving station a similar process is employed, red, blue and green images being presented in rapid success to the eye. The apparatus used at the transmitter consists of a disc perforated with three successive spiral curves of holes. The holes in the first spiral are covered with red filters, in the second with green filters and in the third with blue. Light is projected through these holes and an image of the moving holes is projected onto the object. The disc revolves at 10 revolutions per second and so thirty complete images are transmitted every second — ten blue, ten red, and ten green.

At the receiving station a similar disc revolves synchronously with the transmitting disc, and behind this disc, in line with the eye of the observer, are two glow discharge lamps. One of these lamps is a neon tube and the other a tube containing mercury vapor and helium. By means of a commutator the mercury vapor and helium tube is placed in circuit for two-thirds of a revolution and the neon tube for the remaining third. The red light from the neon is accentuated by placing red filters over the view holes for the red image. Similarly, the view holes corresponding to the green and blue images are covered by suitable filters. The blue and green lights both come from the mercury helium tube, which emits light rich in both colors.

Baird demonstrated a modified two-color version in February 1938, using a red and blue-green filter arrangement in the transmitter; on July 27, 1939 he further demonstrated that colour scanning system in combination with a cathode ray tube with filter wheel as the receiver. By December 1940 he had publicly demonstrating a 600 line version of the system.

Later use
For the first nine months of NTSC color in 1953–1954, CBS continued to use its field-sequential color television cameras, with the field rate and signal adapted for NTSC standards, until RCA delivered its first production model of an NTSC color camera in time for the 1954–55 season.

The Soviet Union was the only other country to experiment with a field-sequential color system. It manufactured a small number of color receivers in 1954 that used a mechanical color disc.

The field-sequential system was used in specialized applications long after it had been replaced for broadcast television. A notable user of the technology was NASA. Field-sequential color cameras were used on the Apollo lunar landing cameras which transmitted color television images from the Moon during missions from 1969 to 1972. Another system was used for the Voyager program in 1979, to take pictures and video of Jupiter. Early Space Shuttle flights (from 1981 to 1995) used cameras with interchangeable lenses. For color transmissions, a field-sequential color system was built into the lens assembly.  For the NASA transmissions, the video from space was field sequential, converted by a duty cycle extension technique to component RGB color video on the ground, and thereafter converted to NTSC and other world standards like PAL and SECAM.

Modern day Digital Light Processing (DLP) projectors commonly use color wheels to generate color images, typically running at a multiple of the video frame rate.

See also
 NTSC Broadcast system that encodes color information into a compatible signal
 SECAM Broadcast system that sends color information sequentially by scan line
 Mechanical television
 Guillermo González Camarena Chromoscopic adapter for television
 History of television
 Penetron – a color CRT system that used field-sequential color

References

External links
 Ed Reitan's Color Television History.
 Early Television Foundation: Early Color TV.
 Comparison of CBS, Col-R-Tel and Apollo moon TV technology.
 How experimenters converted NTSC sets to receive CBS System color.
 About.com: Color Television History.
 John Logie Baird, U.S. patent for color television , filed 1929.

Television technology
History of television